Designs in Machine Embroidery is published bi-monthly by Great Notions News Corporation, based in Dallas, TX. Eileen Roche is the Editor and Publisher who founded the magazine in 1998.  In addition to managing the publication, Eileen also manufactures embroidery related products including books, software and tools.

The magazine founder and editor, Eileen Roche, has appeared on the television show Sewing With Nancy.

Machine Embroidery designs are available in most of format but widely used embroidery format is DST format which is not editable once you have created the design. The editable format of the design is EMB format which is widely used by embroidery digitizers worldwide. You can convert embroidery designs from one format to another one by using au/truesizer Wilcom Truesizer  or ARTsizer Converter.

References

External links

1998 establishments in Texas
Bimonthly magazines published in the United States
Design magazines
Hobby magazines published in the United States
Magazines established in 1998
Magazines published in Texas
Mass media in Dallas
Arts and crafts magazines
Embroidery in the United States